Robert Lilley (3 April 1893 – 12 January 1964) was an English professional footballer who played as a defender. He played 66 matches in the Football League for Nelson.

References

1893 births
1964 deaths
Footballers from Bolton
English footballers
Association football defenders
Rochdale A.F.C. players
Leigh Genesis F.C. players
Nelson F.C. players
English Football League players